The occupation of the Gaza Strip by the United Arab Republic refers to the time period in which the present-day Palestinian territory known as the Gaza Strip was occupied by Egyptian forces of the United Arab Republic from 1949 to 1967. The Egyptian occupation of Gaza began with the inception of the territory in 1949 following the First Arab–Israeli War, and ended after Egypt's defeat to Israel in the Third Arab–Israeli War of 1967, after which the Israeli occupation of the Gaza Strip commenced. Egyptian rule in Gaza before the 1967 war had been continuous with the exception of a brief period from October 1956 to March 1957, when Israel invaded and occupied Gaza as well as the Sinai Peninsula during the Suez Crisis.

From September 1948, until its dissolution by Egyptian President Gamal Abdel Nasser in 1959, the Gaza Strip was officially administered by the All-Palestine Government. Although largely symbolic, the government was recognized by most members of the Arab League. Following its dissolution, Egypt did not annex the Gaza Strip but kept it under military rule, pending a resolution of the Israel–Palestine question.

Background 
After World War I, the League of Nations granted the United Kingdom authority over the Mandate for Palestine composed of former Ottoman territory, including the Gaza Strip. What became known as the British Mandate for Palestine was formally confirmed by the Council of the League of Nations on 24 July 1922 and which came into effect on 26 September 1923.

Three years after World War II on 15 May 1948, the British Mandate for Palestine ended.  Prior to this, on 29 November 1947, the United Nations General Assembly approved the 1947 UN Partition Plan to create in Palestine two states, one Jewish and one Arab. The 1947–1948 Civil War in Mandatory Palestine broke out in response.  On 14 May 1948, David Ben-Gurion declared the independence of the state of Israel and the following day the armies of Egypt, Jordan and Syria declared war and invaded, aided by soldiers sent from Iraq, starting the 1948 Arab–Israeli War.  Egypt made gains early in the war, but these were reversed in late December 1948 when the Israeli army, in "Operation Horev", drove Egyptian forces out of the Negev and encircled the Egyptian Forces in the Gaza Strip, forcing Egypt to withdraw and accept a ceasefire. On 7 January 1949, a truce was achieved. Israeli forces proceeded to withdraw from Sinai and Gaza, leaving them to be occupied by Egypt.

On 24 February 1949, the Israel–Egypt Armistice Agreement was signed in Rhodes. Under the agreement, the armistice line was drawn along the international border (dating from 1906) except near the Mediterranean Sea, where Egypt remained in control of a strip of land along the coast, which became known as the Gaza Strip. (See 1949 Armistice Agreements.)

Egypt Occupation: All-Palestine Protectorate (1948–1950s) 
The All-Palestine Protectorate was an entity established by the Arab League on 22 September 1948, during the 1948 Arab–Israeli War, purportedly to provide Palestinian governance for Palestine. After the war, the Gaza Strip was the only former-Mandate territory under the jurisdiction of the All-Palestine Government. However, the members of the Government were consequently removed to Cairo, and had little or no influence over events in Gaza.

According to Avi Shlaim:[T]he contrast between the pretensions of the All-Palestine Government and its capability quickly reduced it to the level of farce. It claimed jurisdiction over the whole of Palestine, yet it had no administration, no civil service, no money, and no real army of its own. Even in the small enclave around the town of Gaza its writ ran only by the grace of the Egyptian authorities. Taking advantage of the new government's dependence on them for funds and protection, the Egyptian paymasters manipulated it to undermine Abdullah's claim to represent the Palestinians in the Arab League and in international forums. Ostensibly the embryo for an independent Palestinian state, the new government, from the moment of its inception, was thus reduced to the unhappy role of a shuttlecock in the ongoing power struggle between Cairo and Amman.

Suez Crisis and its aftermath 

In 1956, Egypt blockaded the Gulf of Aqaba, assumed national control of the Suez Canal, and blocked it to Israeli shipping—both threatening the young State of Israel and violating the Convention of Constantinople of 1888. France and the United Kingdom supported Israel in its determination that the canal should remain open to all nations as per the convention.

On October 29, 1956, Israel, France and the United Kingdom invaded the Gaza Strip and Sinai Peninsula initiating the 1956 Suez War. Under international pressure, the Anglo-French Task Force withdrew before the end of 1956, and the Israeli army withdrew from the Sinai and Gaza in March, 1957.

UAR administration (1959–67) 
In 1959, the Gaza Strip was officially merged into the short lived United Arab Republic (which united Egypt and Syria). In 1962 the UAR government established a Palestinian Legislative Council elected by the population. The constitutional document began with the following:
The Gaza Strip is an indivisible part of the land of Palestine and its people are part of the Arab Nation. The Palestinians in the Gaza
Strip shall form a National Union composed of all Palestinians wherever they may be - its aim being the joint work to recover the usurped lands of Palestine, and the participation in fulfilling the call of Arab Nationalism. The National Union shall be organized by a decree from the Governor-General.

When the Palestinian Liberation Organization (PLO) was founded in 1964, Nasser proclaimed that it would hold authority over Gaza, but that power was never granted in practice. A year later, conscription was instituted for the Palestinian Liberation Army.

On June 5, 1967, weeks after Egypt blockaded the Straits of Tiran and cut off Israeli shipping, Israel attacked Egypt, initiating the Six-Day War. It quickly defeated the surrounding Arab states and occupied the Gaza Strip, along with the West Bank and other territory, ending Egypt's occupation.

In 1978, Israel and Egypt signed the historic Camp David Accords which brought an official end to the strife between them. The second part of the accords was a framework for the establishment of an autonomous regime in the West Bank and the Gaza Strip. Egypt thus renounced any territorial claims over the Gaza Strip.

Demographics and economy 
The influx of over 200,000 refugees into Gaza during the 1948 war resulted in a dramatic decrease in the standard of living.  Because the Egyptian government restricted movement to and from the Gaza Strip, its inhabitants could not look elsewhere for gainful employment. In 1955, one observer (a member of the United Nations Secretariat) noted that "For all practical purposes it would be true to say that for the last six years in Gaza over 300,000 poverty stricken people have been physically confined to an area the size of a large city park."

See also 
 List of military occupations
 Military occupation
 Jordanian annexation of the West Bank

References

External links 
Legal Status of West Bank, Gaza and East Jerusalem
Gaza Strip (background)
Gaza Strip (history)

History of the Gaza Strip
History of Palestine (region)
20th century in Egypt
1948 in Egypt
States and territories established in 1959
States and territories disestablished in 1967
Military occupation
Egypt–State of Palestine relations